KFUN may refer to:

 KFUN (AM), a radio station (1230 AM) licensed to Las Vegas, New Mexico, United States
 CKKW-FM, branded "KFUN 99.5", a radio station (99.5 FM) licensed to Kitchener, Ontario, Canada